Colefax Group plc is a designer and distributor of furnishing fabrics and wallpaper, based in London in the United Kingdom.

History
The business was founded in the 1930s by Sibyl, Lady Colefax (1874–1950).  In 1938 she was joined in the business by John Fowler, and the business became known as Colefax & Fowler.  In 1944 the business, managed by John Fowler, took a lease on 39 Brook Street, Mayfair where it remained until December 2016. Also in 1944 Sibyl Colefax sold the business to Nancy Tree (Nancy Lancaster as she became in 1948) for a sum in the order of £10000.

The group now has offices in the United States, France, Germany and Italy.  It owns the brands Colefax and Fowler, Cowtan and Tout, Jane Churchill, Larsen and Manuel Canovas

References

External links 
Investor relations website
Company website

Companies based in the City of Westminster
Companies listed on the Alternative Investment Market
Interior design